Hall Road Rangers Football Club is a football club based in Kingston upon Hull, East Riding of Yorkshire, England.

History
The club was formed in 1959 as a Sunday league team by Ted Richardson. They later switched to Saturday football, joining the East Riding County League, before moving up to Division Two of the Yorkshire League in 1968. League reorganisation saw the club demoted to the new Division Three in 1970. They went on to win the division in 1972–73, earning promotion back to Division Two; the season also saw them win the East Riding Senior Cup for the first time. They were relegated to Division Three at the end of the 1975–76 season, but won the division again in 1979–80 and were promoted back to Division Two.

In 1982 the Yorkshire League merged with the Midland League to form the Northern Counties East League. Hall Road Rangers were placed in Division One North, but finished bottom of the division in the league's first season, resulting in relegation to Division Two North. League restructuring saw them placed in Division One North for the 1984–85 season, and the following season they were placed in the new Division Three. However, Division Three was dissolved after a single season and the club moved into Division Two. In 1990–91 they won the Division Two title and were promoted to Division One. The 1993–94 season saw the club win the East Riding Senior Cup for the second time.

In 2003–04 Hall Road Rangers won the league's Wilkinson Sword Trophy, beating Garforth Town 5–4 on aggregate in the final. In 2007–08 they were Division One runners-up, earning promotion to the Premier Division, and also won the Wilkinson Sword Trophy for a second time with a 3–2 aggregate win over Teversal in the final. However, after finishing bottom of the Premier Division in 2012–13 they were relegated back to Division One. In 2016–17 they won the Division One title and were promoted to the Premier Division. The club finished bottom of the Premier Division in 2018–19 and were relegated back to Division One.

Ground
The club played at Dene Park in Dunswell until 2015, when they moved to Haworth Park in the Bransholme area of Hull, a former home ground of Hull RUFC. The ground has a capacity of 1,200, of which 250 is seated and 750 covered.

Honours
Northern Counties East League
Division One champions 1990–91, 2016–17
League Trophy winners 2003–04, 2007–08
Yorkshire League
Division Three champions 1972–73, 1979–80
East Riding Senior Cup
Winners 1972–73, 1993–94, 1994–95

Records
Best FA Cup performance: First qualifying round, 2007–08
Best FA Vase performance: Third round, 1999–2000
Record attendance: 1,200 vs Manchester City, friendly match, August 1993
Most appearances: G James
Most goals: G James

See also
Hall Road Rangers F.C. players

References

External links
Official website

Football clubs in England
Football clubs in the East Riding of Yorkshire
Association football clubs established in 1959
1959 establishments in England
Sport in Kingston upon Hull
East Riding County League
Yorkshire Football League
Northern Counties East Football League